Huaqiao may refer to:

Overseas Chinese (华侨), or Huaqiao in pinyin
Huaqiao University (华侨大学), in Quanzhou, Fujian
Huaqiao railway station (花桥站), station of the Shanghai-Nanjing Intercity High-Speed Railway in Shanghai
Huaqiao station (Shanghai Metro) (花桥站), station of Line 11, Shanghai Metro
Huaqiao Road Subdistrict (华侨路街道), Gulou District, Nanjing
Towns
Huaqiao, Yujiang County (画桥镇), Jiangxi
Written as "花桥镇":
Huaqiao, Anhui, in Wuhu County
Huaqiao, Chongqing, in Zhong County
Huaqiao, Guizhou, in Shiqian County
Huaqiao, Wuxue, in Hubei
Huaqiao, Dong'an County, Hunan
 Huaqiao, Hengnan (花桥镇), a town of Hengnan County, Hunan.
 Huaqiao, Zhongfang (花桥镇),  a town of Zhongfang County, Hunan
Huaqiao, Kunshan, Jiangsu
Huaqiao, Shangrao, in Dexing, Jiangxi
Huaqiao, Guang'an, in Guang'an District, Guang'an, Sichuan
Huaqiao, Xinjin County, Sichuan
Huaqiao, Sanmen County, Zhejiang